George Thompson (July 6, 1918 – November 11, 1982) was Attorney General of Wisconsin from 1963 to 1965.

Thompson was born in Ellsworth, Wisconsin. He received his public education in Hudson, Wisconsin;George Thompson attended the University of Wisconsin–River Falls 1936–37, and then St. Olaf College, Northfield, Minnesota, where he received his B.A. degree in 1940. He then attended the University of Wisconsin–Madison, where he received an M.A. degree in 1941 and an LL.B. degree in 1947. He was a practicing attorney from 1947 until his death. A World War II veteran, he served in the United States Army 1942–45. George Thompson served as a police and fire commissioner for La Crosse, Wisconsin 1952–54, and was then elected La Crosse County, Wisconsin District Attorney 1955–1961. Thompson then taught law at Ohio Northern University and Western New England University. Thompson died in a hospital in Springfield, Massachusetts from a long illness.

References

External links

1918 births
1982 deaths
People from Ellsworth, Wisconsin
Military personnel from Wisconsin
Wisconsin Attorneys General
District attorneys in Wisconsin
St. Olaf College alumni
University of Wisconsin–Madison alumni
University of Wisconsin Law School alumni
University of Wisconsin–River Falls alumni
Ohio Northern University faculty
Western New England University faculty
20th-century American lawyers
20th-century American politicians